Flicker vertigo, sometimes called the Bucha effect, is "an imbalance in brain-cell activity caused by exposure to low-frequency flickering (or flashing) of a relatively bright light." It is a disorientation-, vertigo-, and nausea-inducing effect of a strobe light flashing at 1 Hz to 20 Hz, approximately the frequency of human brainwaves. The effects are similar to seizures caused by epilepsy (in particular photosensitive epilepsy), but are not restricted to people with histories of epilepsy.

This phenomenon has been observed during helicopter flight; a Dr. Bucha identified the phenomenon in the 1950s when called upon to investigate a series of similar and unexplained helicopter crashes. Flicker vertigo in a helicopter occurs when the pilot or front passenger looks up through the blades of the main rotor as it turns in the sun causing the light to strobe.

The strobe light effect can cause persons who are vulnerable to flicker vertigo to experience symptoms such as:
 Become disoriented and/or nauseated
 Blink rapidly
 Experience rapid eye movements behind closed eyelids
 Lose control of fine motor functions
 Experience muscle rigidity

These effects are typically very minor and will most often subside within seconds once exposure to the strobe effect has ceased, though residual nausea and minor disorientation may be felt for several minutes.

In extremely rare cases, severe reactions can happen including:
 Total persistent loss of bodily functions
 Loss of muscle/motor response
 Loss of control of aircraft or other moving vehicles
 Seizure

This situation can occur whenever flickering light conditions exist.  Examples of this include:
 Using electronics on low-light conditions for extended periods
 Sunlight flickering through a tree-lined street
 Sunlight reflecting off of water, especially off of rippling waves
 Fixed wing flight
 Looking at or through a slowly spinning propeller

According to The US Naval Flight Surgeons Manual, flicker vertigo is a rare occurrence.

Flicker vertigo has been considered as a principle for various forms of non-lethal weapons. A related crowd-control device was invented by Charles Bovill, which "employed a combination of ultra-sonic waves and strobe lights to induce acute discomfort, sickness, disorientation and sometimes epilepsy."

See also
 Air safety
 National Transportation Safety Board
 Mind machine

References

External links
 Flight Safety Foundation
 Flicker illness: an underrecognized but preventable complication of helicopter transport.
 "LED-based incapacitating apparatus and method", filed in 2005 — a patent for a device based on this phenomenon.
 "New Robo-Weapon: Paralyzing Floodlight", Wired Danger Room blog, February 20, 2007 — a description of a weapon based on a similar phenomenon.

Neurological disorders